The  was a fragmentation hand grenade deployed by the Imperial Japanese Army during World War II. The explosive charge contained  of picric acid (a cheaper and more powerful but less safe explosive than TNT).

History
In 2015, Type 98s were documented to have been found in the Democratic Republic of Congo.

Design
The weapon operated identically to the Chinese versions of the German Model 24 stick grenade which had been encountered in the Second Sino-Japanese War. It was based on these grenades, except that a pull ring was attached to the igniting cord, and the actual fuse delay itself was reduced to four to five seconds (varying from grenade to grenade).

References

External links
http://www.lexpev.nl/grenades/middleeastasia/japan/type98.html

45
Hand grenades of Japan